Hans Eschenbrenner (7 November 1910 – 9 July 2007) was a German sports shooter who represented Saar. He competed in the 50 m rifle, prone event at the 1952 Summer Olympics.

References

External links
 

1910 births
2007 deaths
German male sport shooters
Olympic shooters of Saar
Shooters at the 1952 Summer Olympics
People from Saarpfalz-Kreis
Sportspeople from Saarland